Havilah is a place in the Hebrew Bible.

Havilah may also refer to:

Havilah (album), the Drones album
Havilah, California, a US location
Havilah, New South Wales, an Australian location
Hoveyleh, an Iranian village